The Muratti Vase is an annual men's and women's football competition, inaugurated in 1905, between teams representing the Channel Islands of Alderney, Guernsey and Jersey. The larger islands of Guernsey and Jersey dominate the competition, with Alderney's sole match final championship victory occurring in 1920.

History 
Since its inception, the competition has been interrupted only between 1915–1919 and 1940–1946 due to the First and Second World Wars. The teams wear their island colours of green and white (Guernsey) and red and white (Jersey) and blue and white (Alderney). The competition is sponsored by Hepburns Insurance and now includes Ladies', under 21s and an under 18s competition for men.

The tournament consists of a semi-final and a final. Before the Second World War the draw for the semi-final rotated between the three islands, but since then Jersey and Guernsey have taken turns to play Alderney in the semi.

The Final is played on alternate years in Guernsey and Jersey. When in Guernsey it is played at either Footes Lane or The Track for a number of years and in Jersey at Springfield Stadium.

The first Muratti final took place at Springfield on 27 April 1905, but after two years the venue for Muratti matches in Jersey moved to Westmount until 1923 when Springfield became host in alternate years. Since 1930 Muratti matches in Jersey have been regularly held at Springfield with few exceptions.

Up until 2005 a drawn final would be replayed. Seven finals were decided on a replay. Since 2006, the game has been decided on the day and three matches have gone to extra time since then, with all these matches being decided on a penalty shoot-out.

2016 saw Jersey host the 100th final.

The 2020 & 2021 competitions were postponed due to the COVID-19 pandemic.

Participants

Venues 
The tournament is hosted in three venues:

Results 
A full list of Muratti results. Home team listed first unless noted.

Notes

Winners by Island 

updated to 2022

Records 
Jersey hold the record for longest run as champions, having held the title for eight years between 1958 and 1965.

Guernsey's longest unbeaten run was a stretch of five finals between 1932 and 1936. They were prevented a sixth straight win by a tie in 1937, the only year the title has been shared. Guernsey won it in 1938 meaning they held the trophy for seven years, albeit one of those shared.

Alderney have not won a match in the competition since 1920 despite some very close performances in recent years.

 The biggest victory margin is an 18–0 win by Jersey over Alderney in the 1994 semi-final.
 The biggest victory margin in a final was 7–1 in 1926 when Jersey beat Alderney.
 The highest scoring final was in 1957 when Guernsey beat Jersey 6–4.

Change of name 
It was reported in March 2009 that the name of the competition would have to be changed due to proposed legislative restrictions on tobacco advertising in Jersey. Although the Muratti brand of cigarettes is not sold in Jersey, the name of the tobacco manufacturer linked to the name of the trophy would fall within the ban on promotion of brands.

Youth Tournaments

Men's U-16 

Guernsey and Jersey under 16 men's team have competed in their own Muratti Cup since 2007. In 2018, female player Maya Le Tissier made her debut for the Guernsey team in the Muratti Cup, being the first female player to play for any Guernsey men's team. This was in light of the Guernsey women's team being disbanded the previous year.

Results

Women's tournament 
The Muratti Cup is the women's equivalent of the tournament. Unlike the men's version, the women's competition is a one off match between Jersey and Guernsey only. The competition ran from its inception in 1997 to 2017 when the Guernsey women's team was disbanded. The tournament restarted in 2022.

Results

See also 
Alderney national football team
Guernsey national football team
Jersey national football team
Upton Park Trophy
Inter-insular match – the equivalent event in cricket
Siam Cup – the equivalent event in rugby union

References

External links 
 RSSSF
 Guernsey FA
 Jersey FA
 Alderney FC

Sport in the Channel Islands
Football in Guernsey
Football in Jersey
Football in Alderney
Recurring sporting events established in 1905
Non-FIFA football competitions
1905 establishments in Europe
1905 establishments in the British Empire